Homo sacer (Latin for "the sacred man" or "the accursed man") is a figure of Roman law: a person who is banned and might or might not be killed by anybody, but must not be sacrificed in a religious ritual.

The meaning of the term sacer in Ancient Roman religion is not fully congruent with the meaning it took after Christianization, and which was adopted into English as sacred. In early Roman religion sacer denotes anything "set apart" from common society and encompasses both the sense of "hallowed" and that of "cursed". This concept of the sacred contrasts with the Hebrew dichotomy of "cursed/prohibited" and "sacred", expressed by "cherem" and "qadosh". The homo sacer could thus also simply mean a person expunged from society and deprived of all rights and all functions in civil religion. Homo sacer is defined in legal terms as someone who can be killed without the killer being regarded as a murderer; and a person who cannot be sacrificed. The sacred human may thus be understood as someone outside the law, or beyond it. With respect to certain monarchs, in certain western legal traditions, the concepts of the sovereign and of the homo sacer have been conflated.

The term sacred man could also have been used because the condemned could only rely on protection of gods.

The status of homo sacer could fall upon one as a consequence of oath-breaking. An oath in antiquity was essentially a conditional self-cursing, i.e. invoking one or more deities and asking for their punishment in the event of breaking the oath. An oathbreaker was consequently considered the property of the gods whom he had invoked and then deceived. If the oathbreaker was killed, this was understood as the revenge of the gods into whose power he had given himself. Since the oathbreaker was already the property of the oath deity, he could no longer belong to human society, or be consecrated to another deity.

A direct reference to this status is found in the Twelve Tables (8.21), the laws of the early Roman Republic written in the fifth century BC. The paragraph states that a patron who deceives his clients is to be regarded as sacer.

The idea of the status of an outlaw, a criminal who is declared as unprotected by the law and can consequently be killed by anyone with impunity, persisted throughout the Middle Ages. Medieval perception condemned the entire human race to the intrinsic moral worth of the outlaw, dehumanizing the outlaw literally as a "wolf" or "wolf's-head" (in an era where hunting of wolves existed strongly, including a commercial element) and is first revoked only by the English Habeas Corpus Act of 1679 which declares that any criminal must be judged by a tribunal before being punished.

Italian philosopher Giorgio Agamben takes the concept as the starting point of his main work Homo Sacer: Sovereign Power and Bare Life (1998).

See also
Proscription, a related Roman legal practice instituted by Sulla 
Burakumin, a similar practice in Japan
Civil death, the loss of most or all civil rights as a punishment
Dalit, the lowest caste in India
Hague Conventions
Hostis humani generis, in admiralty law, a term for pirates and slavers which may be attacked by any nation
Kafir, a term in Islam for someone who rejects God's authority
Nonperson, a person without social or legal status
Outcast (person), someone rejected by or excluded from society 
Stateless person, someone not considered a national by any state
Persona non grata, someone whose diplomatic immunity has been revoked
Third Geneva Convention
Unlawful combatant, category in United States law for attackers not regarded as protected by the Geneva Conventions
Vogelfrei, a German person declared outside the protection of the law

References

. Trans. Daniel Heller-Roazen.

External links
Homo sacer y violencia divina en el caso judío: lo insacrificable sometido a castigo de Ely Orrego
Interview with Giorgio Agamben – Life, A Work of Art Without an Author: The State of Exception, the Administration of Disorder and Private Life By Ulrich Raulff, German Law Journal No. 5 - Special Edition, 1 May 2004)
[ The Refugee & the Decline of the Nation State] A paper delivered by Andonis Tsonis at 'Forms of Legal Identity', 19th Annual Law & Society Conference, Melbourne, 10–12 December 2001
"We Refugees" , Giogio Agamben on Hannah Arendt in Symposium #49
Knight of the Living Dead March 24, 2007 New York Times Op-Ed piece by Slavoj Zizek on Terrorism and normalization of torture.

Ancient Roman religion
Crime and punishment in ancient Rome
Emergency laws
Human rights
Latin legal terminology
Philosophy of law
Roman law
Caste
Sacrifice